St. Lawrence and Elizabeth is the Catholic parish church in Aulzhausen (Aichach-Friedberg, Bavaria, Germany). The church of Lawrence of Rome and Elizabeth of Hungary was erected in the 18th century and is a protected monument.

Roman Catholic churches in Bavaria